The 1951 Brooklyn Dodgers led the National League for much of the season, holding a 13-game lead as late as August. However, a late season swoon and a hot streak by the New York Giants led to a classic three-game playoff series. Bobby Thomson's dramatic ninth-inning home run off Dodger reliever Ralph Branca in the final game won the pennant for the Giants and was immortalized as the Shot Heard 'Round the World.

Offseason 
 October 10, 1950: Chuck Connors and Dee Fondy were traded by the Dodgers to the Chicago Cubs for Hank Edwards and cash.
 October 13, 1950: Buddy Hicks was purchased from the Dodgers by the Philadelphia Phillies.
 November 16, 1950: Morrie Martin was drafted from the Dodgers by the Philadelphia Athletics  in the 1950 rule 5 draft.
 February 6, 1951: Chico Fernández was signed by the Dodgers as an amateur free agent.

Regular season

Season standings

Record vs. opponents

Opening Day Lineup

Notable transactions 
 June 8, 1951: Tommy Brown was traded by the Dodgers to the Philadelphia Phillies for Dick Whitman and cash.
 June 15, 1951: Bruce Edwards, Joe Hatten, Eddie Miksis and Gene Hermanski were traded by the Dodgers to the Chicago Cubs for Johnny Schmitz, Rube Walker, Andy Pafko and Wayne Terwilliger.
 June 18, 1951: Bob Lillis was signed as an amateur free agent by the Dodgers.
 July 24, 1951: Ben Taylor was traded by the Dodgers to the St. Louis Browns for Johnny Bero, Joe Lutz and cash.
 August 31, 1951: Ross Grimsley was purchased from the Dodgers by the Chicago White Sox.

Roster

Player stats

Batting

Starters by position 
Note: Pos = Position; G = Games played; AB = At bats; H = Hits; Avg. = Batting average; HR = Home runs; RBI = Runs batted in

Other batters 
Note: G = Games played; AB = At bats; H = Hits; Avg. = Batting average; HR = Home runs; RBI = Runs batted in

Pitching

Starting pitchers 
Note: G = Games pitched; IP = Innings pitched; W = Wins; L = Losses; ERA = Earned run average; SO = Strikeouts

Other pitchers 
Note: G = Games pitched; IP = Innings pitched; W = Wins; L = Losses; ERA = Earned run average; SO = Strikeouts

Relief pitchers 
Note: G = Games pitched; W = Wins; L = Losses; SV = Saves; ERA = Earned run average; SO = Strikeouts

Shot Heard 'Round the World 

One of the more famous episodes in major league baseball history, and possibly one of the greatest moments in sports history, the "Shot Heard 'Round the World" is the name given to Bobby Thomson's walk-off home run that clinched the National League pennant for the New York Giants over their rivals, the Brooklyn Dodgers. This game was the third of a three-game playoff series resulting from one of baseball's most memorable pennant races. The Giants had been thirteen and a half games behind the league-leading Dodgers in August, but under Durocher's guidance and with the aid of a sixteen-game winning streak, caught the Dodgers to tie for the lead on the last day of the season.  The radio broadcast of Bobby Thomson's pennant-winning home run was chronicled on a 1955 Columbia Masterworks vinyl LP record, "The Greatest Moments in Sports."

Awards and honors 
National League Most Valuable Player
Roy Campanella
TSN Pitcher of the Year Award
Preacher Roe

All-Stars 
1951 Major League Baseball All-Star Game
Roy Campanella starter
Gil Hodges starter
Jackie Robinson starter
Don Newcombe reserve
Pee Wee Reese reserve
Preacher Roe reserve
Duke Snider reserve
TSN Major League All-Star Team
Preacher Roe
Roy Campanella
Jackie Robinson

Farm system 

LEAGUE CHAMPIONS: Montreal, Santa Barbara

Notes

References 
Baseball-Reference season page
Baseball Almanac season page

External links 
1951 Brooklyn Dodgers uniform
Brooklyn Dodgers reference site
Acme Dodgers page 
Retrosheet

 
Brooklyn Dodgers
Los Angeles Dodgers seasons
Jackie Robinson
1951 in sports in New York City
1950s in Brooklyn
Flatbush, Brooklyn